Benjamin Thomas Kuku (born 8 March 1995 in Jos) is a Nigerian footballer who plays as a striker.

References

External links
 
 

1995 births
Living people
Nigerian footballers
FC Zalău players
LPS HD Clinceni players
ASA 2013 Târgu Mureș players
FC Botoșani players
Sepsi OSK Sfântu Gheorghe players
Hapoel Kfar Saba F.C. players
Hapoel Petah Tikva F.C. players
F.C. Kafr Qasim players
Hapoel Ra'anana A.F.C. players
Hapoel Nir Ramat HaSharon F.C. players
Maccabi Bnei Reineh F.C. players
Maccabi Ahi Nazareth F.C. players
Liga I players
Liga II players
Liga Leumit players
Israeli Premier League players
Nigerian expatriate footballers
Expatriate footballers in Romania
Expatriate footballers in Israel
Nigerian expatriate sportspeople in Romania
Nigerian expatriate sportspeople in Israel
Association football forwards
Sportspeople from Jos